Marcus Fornell (born July 19, 1994) is a Swedish ice hockey player. He made his Elitserien debut playing with Linköpings HC during the 2012–13 Elitserien season.

References

External links

1994 births
Living people
Swedish ice hockey centres
Linköping HC players